Chapursan (also spelt Chipurson, Chiporson, Chaporsan, Chupurson) is a valley containing approximately eight scattered villages situated within the Hunza District of Gilgit−Baltistan in Pakistan. It is located in the northern part of the country, close to the border with the Wakhan District of Afghanistan and the Xinjiang Uyghur Autonomous Region of China. The valley is predominantly inhabited by ethnic Wakhis; the village of Raminj in this region is inhabited by ethnic Burushos. The valley's inhabitants largely adhere to the Isma'ili sect of Shia Islam. Chapurson hosts over 500 households with an estimated population of 3000 people.

Geography 

The Chipurson valley is above 3000 meters from sea level and the villages are Yarzerech, Raminj, Kirmin (Noorabad, Rahimabad & Aminabad), Kil (Khill), Reshit, Shehr-e-Subz (Green City), Ispenj, Shitmerg and ZuwudKhoon (also spelled Zood Khun, Zoodkhun. Khudayarabad).

After Zood Khun pastures are  Yashkuk, Kukchaizem, Biban Joi, Koorban, Korkot, Joi Sam, Dainkut, Khudayar Alga, Kimkut, Aston ( Baba Ghundhi ). Yashwoshitk, Shipodkut, Pomiri( Pamiri ), Pamir and more.
All the names of villages and Pastures are in Wakhi language.

The valley is full of peaks and passes. Passes include Irshad Pass between Pakistan and Afghanistan and Lupghar Pir Pass between Yeshkuk and Raminj village. Peaks include Sakar Sar, Kumpire Dior, Pumir Sar, Sarmaya Sar, Kuksar, and Lupghar Sar.

Sites of interest 
Chapursan Valley has historical places like Yaskuk, Rovai Sam, Khumpir Dior, and the Shrine of Baba Ghundi.

Shrine of Baba Ghundi (Baba Ghundi Ziarat) in the Chuparsan Valley is the shrine of the famous Pir of Ghund who is celebrated in legend as the Sufi saint who brought Islam to the valley. The saint is not actually buried here.  The former Mir of Hunza kept his herds of sheep and goats for grazing around here and used to visit the shrine every year.  The people of Hunza Valley also revere the saint and it is said that children who are a problem for their parents have only to taste the mud from a stream near Baba Ghundi after which they become obedient and well behaved.

References 

Valleys of Gilgit-Baltistan